D-arabitol-phosphate dehydrogenase (APDH, D-arabitol 1-phosphate dehydrogenase, D-arabitol 5-phosphate dehydrogenase) is an enzyme with systematic name D-arabitol-phosphate:NAD+ oxidoreductase. This enzyme catalyses the following chemical reaction

 D-arabitol 1-phosphate + NAD+  D-xylulose 5-phosphate + NADH + H+

This enzyme participates in arabitol catabolism. The enzyme also converts D-arabitol 5-phosphate to D-ribulose 5-phosphate at a lower rate.

References

External links 
 

EC 1.1.1